The 2021 Indian Premier League, also known as IPL 14, or for sponsorship reasons, VIVO IPL 2021, was the fourteenth season of the Indian Premier League (IPL), a professional Twenty20 cricket league established by the Board of Control for Cricket in India (BCCI) in 2007. The tagline was Asli Picture Abhi Baaki Hai (Now the original picture will come).

Mumbai Indians were the two-time defending champions. Ahead of the tournament, Kings XI Punjab were renamed as the Punjab Kings. In March 2021, the BCCI announced the fixtures for the tournament. The tournament started on 9 April. However, on 4 May, the tournament was suspended indefinitely, after a rise in COVID-19 cases within the bio bubbles of some teams. At the time of the suspension, 31 of the scheduled 60 matches were still left to be played. On 29 May 2021, the BCCI announced that the remaining matches of the tournament would be played in the United Arab Emirates in September and October 2021. The schedule for the remainder of the tournament was released in July 2021.

In the final, Chennai Super Kings beat Kolkata Knight Riders to win their fourth IPL title. Ruturaj Gaikwad scored the most runs in the tournament, while Harshal Patel took the most wickets and also won the Most Valuable Player award.

Background
Mumbai Indians were the two-time defending champions, having won both the 2019 and the 2020 seasons. Although early reports suggested the addition of two more teams in the season, the Board of Control for Cricket in India (BCCI) announced in their 89th  that the inclusion of two new teams would be delayed until the 2022 season. The Kings XI Punjab were renamed to Punjab Kings ahead of the tournament.

On 30 January 2021, the BCCI announced that they expected to host the tournament in India, and that the UAE, which had hosted the previous season due to the COVID-19 pandemic, was not being considered as a backup venue. On the day of the auction, the BCCI also confirmed that Vivo had returned as the title sponsor, after it had pulled out of the previous tournament. As of late February, the BCCI was considering hosting the tournament in a few shortlisted cities: Kolkata, Delhi, Bangalore, Ahmedabad and Chennai, with Mumbai as an additional option.

On 7 March 2021, the BCCI announced the full schedule for the season. Six venues, including all the five shortlisted venues and the additional option, Mumbai, were scheduled to host matches. To avoid home advantage, no team was scheduled to play at their home venue. The season was scheduled to start from 9 April, with the final taking place on 30 May at the Narendra Modi Stadium in Ahmedabad. The BCCI also confirmed that the tournament would begin behind closed doors, and a call on letting spectators in would be taken at a later stage. After the sudden rise in COVID-19 cases in India, Hyderabad was also added as a backup venue, though no matches were played there.

Personnel changes

The released players were announced on 20 January 2021. Steve Smith, Aaron Finch and Glenn Maxwell were the prominent names among the released players. Piyush Chawla, the costliest Indian player at the 2020 auction, was also released.

The players' auction was held on 18 February 2021 in Chennai.

COVID-19 impact
Due to the worsening COVID-19 situation in India, several players, including Liam Livingstone and Adam Zampa, withdrew from the tournament. After the Chennai leg of the tournament, Ravichandran Ashwin left the Delhi Capitals bio-bubble to "support [his] family" during the pandemic. On 3 May 2021, the scheduled match between Kolkata Knight Riders and Royal Challengers Bangalore was postponed after two Kolkata players tested positive for COVID-19. On the same day, three members of the Chennai Super Kings camp – including their bowling coach Lakshmipathy Balaji and CEO Kasi Viswanathan, tested positive. Later, the entire Delhi Capitals team was put into quarantine. Mumbai Indians and Sunrisers Hyderabad skipped their practice sessions ahead of their match on 4 May. As a result, the BCCI looked at hosting the remaining fixtures of the tournament in Mumbai.

However, on 4 May 2021, the Chennai Super Kings versus Rajasthan Royals match, scheduled for the following day, was also postponed due to the Chennai players being in quarantine. Later the same day, Hyderabad's Wriddhiman Saha and Delhi's Amit Mishra tested positive for the virus. On 4 May, the season was suspended indefinitely. On 5 May 2021, Michael Hussey, the batting coach of Chennai, became the first overseas individual to test positive. Tim Seifert and Prasidh Krishna of Kolkata tested positive as well.

On 6 May 2021, a group of English counties made an offer to host the remaining matches of the tournament in England in September 2021. But Sourav Ganguly, the president of the BCCI, ruled out the possibility of the tournament being completed in England or India, citing difficulties around quarantine rules. The BCCI were looking to play the remaining matches in September and October 2021, a plan that was confirmed on 25 July. It was then announced that the remainder of the tournament would take place in the UAE. The second half started on 19 September, with the final to be held on 15 October in Dubai. After the relocation to the UAE, the organisers were looking to allow at least 50% capacity of vaccinated audience in the stadium, if permitted by the local government. Four days before the restart, spectators who followed COVID-19 protocols were allowed in.

Venues
Matches in the first leg were played in Delhi, Ahmedabad, Mumbai and Chennai. In addition, the Eden Gardens in Kolkata and M. Chinnaswamy Stadium in Bangalore were also scheduled to host matches, but they were relocated.

After the tournament was shifted to the UAE, the matches were held in Dubai, Sharjah, and Abu Dhabi.

Teams and standings

Points table
Each team received two points for a victory, one each for a no-result match, and none for a loss. The teams were ranked based on the number of points. If it was equal, the net run rate would determine the rankings.

Match summary

League stage 

The schedule for the league stages was published on the official IPL website on 7 March, and the schedule of the postponed matches to be held in the UAE was released on 25 July. The final two games of the league stage were played concurrently for the first time in the IPL history, as decided in the IPL Governing Council meeting on 28 September. The league follows the double round-robin format, where every team plays each other twice, and the top four teams advance to the playoffs. There were no home and away games, and no team played at their home ground. Rules and regulations dictated by the International Cricket Council were followed. If both teams score the same number of runs, a super over would follow.

Matches

India

UAE

Playoffs 

The top-four teams qualified for the playoffs. The first two teams would play each other in the first qualifier, where the winner would progress to the final, while the loser would play in the second qualifier. The eliminator was played between the third and fourth teams. While the loser was knocked off, the winner would advance to the second qualifier. The winner of this match would qualify as the second finalist. The IPL 2021 playoffs started on 10 October 2021, and the final was played on 15 October.

Preliminary 

Qualifier 1

Eliminator

Qualifier 2

Final 

Kolkata Knight Riders won the toss and opted to bowl. Chennai Super Kings scored 192 runs in 20 overs, losing 3 wickets. Faf du Plessis became the highest scorer with 86 runs, while Ruturaj Gaikwad and Moeen Ali complimented with substantial scores. For the fielding team, Sunil Narine took 2 wickets. In the second innings, Kolkata started well after Venkatesh Iyer made a fifty. But they soon lost many wickets, with Shardul Thakur taking 3 of them. Chennai went on to win the match by 27 runs.

Statistics and awards 
Players are given several awards with a trophy and prize money at the end of each season. The Most Valuable Player award is given to the player who accumulates the most points, depending upon their overall performance like the number of fours, sixes and wickets. The Orange Cap is given to the player who scored the most runs, while the Purple Cap is presented to the one with most wickets. The Emerging Player award is given to a young player with the most promising performance, who meets the given guidelines. Fairplay award is given to the team which played most in accordance with the rules, being fair, and upholding the spirit of the game. The player who changed the game for their teams gets the Gamechanger award, and the one with the highest strike rate is presented with the Super Striker award. The player hitting the most sixes gets an award, along with the one who performs the best in the powerplay. The Perfect Catch of the Season award is given to the player who took the best catch in the season. Ravi Bishnoi of the Punjab Kings won the award for his catch taken against Kolkata Knight Riders in match 21 to dismiss Sunil Narine, where he took a diving catch at deep mid-wicket.

Most runs 

  Orange Cap

Most wickets 

  Purple Cap

End of the season awards

See also
 Impact of the COVID-19 pandemic on cricket

References

External links
 Series home at ESPNcricinfo

 
Indian Premier League seasons
Indian Premier League
Indian Premier League